Fatemeh Bodaghi is an Iranian conservative politician who served as the vice president for legal affairs under Mahmoud Ahmadinejad.

She was previously the deputy for education and research at the Judiciary's center for barristers and legal advisor. Bodaghi also served as legal advisor to the Chief Justice of Iran.

References

Vice Presidents of Iran for Legal Affairs
Female vice presidents of Iran
1966 births
Living people
Iranian jurists
Islamic Azad University alumni
Women vice presidents
21st-century Iranian women politicians
21st-century Iranian politicians